Thuy Tran is an American politician and optometrist serving as a member of the Oregon House of Representatives for the 45th district. Elected in November 2022, she assumed office in January 2023.

Early life and education 
Tran was born in South Vietnam and immigrated to the United States with her family as a child. She earned a Bachelor of Science degree in biology from the University of California, Los Angeles, a Doctor of Optometry from Pacific University, and a Master of Business Administration from George Fox University.

Career 
Since 1995, Tran has owned and operated Rose City Vision. From 2012 to 2015, she served as a member of the Parkrose School District Board. Tran is also a lieutenant colonel in the Oregon Air National Guard. Tran was elected to the Oregon House of Representatives in November 2022.

Electoral history

2022

References 

Living people
Oregon Democrats
Members of the Oregon House of Representatives
People from Portland, Oregon
Politicians from Portland, Oregon
American optometrists
University of California, Los Angeles alumni
Pacific University alumni
George Fox University alumni
American politicians of Vietnamese descent
Year of birth missing (living people)